Wat Klang Bang Kaeo is a temple in Nakhon Chai Si District, Central Thailand. Located on the Tha Chin River, the temple was established during the Ayutthaya period.

Description 
The temple was built during the rule of the Ayutthaya Kingdom and was formerly known as Wat Khongkharam. The temple has three floors and contains Buddhist art and iconography.

References 

Buddhist temples in Thailand